Richard Shorr (November 24, 1942 – August 13, 2001) was an American sound editor who was nominated at the Academy Awards for Best Sound Editing. He was nominated for Die Hard, which he shared the nomination with Stephen Hunter Flick. The nomination was at the 61st Academy Awards.

Selected filmography

Highlander II: The Quickening (1992)
Shipwrecked (1991)
Teenage Mutant Ninja Turtles (1990)
Die Hard (1988)
Poltergeist III (1988)
Predator (1987)

References

External links

1942 births
2001 deaths
American sound editors
Musicians from New York City
Emmy Award winners